Kirsteen is a name, notable people with this name are:
 Kirsteen Kim (born 21 September 1959), British theologist
 Kirsteen MacDonald, Scottish broadcaster
 Kirsteen Mackay, British-Australian architect
 Kirsteen McEwan (born 20 November 1975), retired Scottish badminton player
 Kirsteen O'Sullivan (born 24 November 1979), Scottish broadcaster
 Kirsteen Tinto, New Zealander glaciologist

See also
 Kirsten
 Kirstin
 Kursztyn

English feminine given names